Dinho is a Portuguese male name. Notable people with this name include:

 Dinho (footballer) (born 2000), São Toméan midfielder
 Dinho (Brazilian footballer), see 1995 Copa Libertadores
 Dinho Chingunji (born 1964) a political leader in UNITA, a pro-Western rebel group in Angola
 Dinho Ouro Preto, lead singer of Capital Inicial
 Dinho, lead singer of Mamonas Assassinas

Portuguese masculine given names